Corruption in France describes the prevention and occurrence of corruption in France.

France has ratified several important international anti-corruption conventions such as the OECD Convention on Combating Bribery of Foreign Public Officials in International Business Transactions and the United Nations Convention against Corruption. In general, investors do not consider corruption a problem for doing business in France, and companies operating in France generally have a good reputation of corporate social responsibility.

The French National Assembly have proved two bills for combating tax evasion. However, in recent years there are several corruption scandals involving high-ranking public officials. Public works and the defence industry are considered the most affected by corruption.

Transparency International's 2021 Corruption Perceptions Index scored France at 71 on a scale from 0 ("highly corrupt") to 100 ("highly clean"). When ranked by score, France ranked 22nd among the 180 countries in the Index, where the country ranked first is perceived to have the most honest public sector.  For comparison, the best score was 88 (ranked 1), and the worst score was 11 (ranked 180).

Extent and perceptions 

In 2011, Transparency International concluded in its annual report for 2011 that France does not do enough to stop corruption. A TNS Sofres poll in October 2011 indicated that 72% of the French public had the perception that politicians are corrupt.

In France in 2009 all major foreign investors and exporters and more than 80 per cent of surveyed executives admitted to 'not being familiar at all' with one of the most important legal frameworks in global business. A cartel constitutes a crime punishable by imprisonment and/or fines.  Staff and budgets for public enforcement of securities regulation was a one third in France compared to UK in 2008.

Areas

Elections 
Political corruption studies include the presidential campaign 2007 finance investigation in the value of €150,000 from Liliane Bettencourt to Nicolas Sarkozy. The maximum individual support is €4,600. Jacques Chirac was accused of using public funds for his election campaign in Paris in the 1990s. 
On 15 December 2011, Chirac was found guilty and given a suspended sentence of two years. He was convicted of diverting public funds, abuse of trust and illegal conflict of interest.

The suspended sentence meant he did not have to go to prison and took account of his age, health, and status as a former head of state. He did not attend his trial since medical doctors deemed that his neurological problems damaged his memory.

Bribery 
Bribery investigations from  Africa to France are ongoing, including bribery claims of Jacques Chirac, Dominique de Villepin and Jean-Marie Le Pen bribery claim from Gabon ex-president Omar Bongo. In September 2011 was judged Bernard Granie of 300 000 bribery from Provence Recyclage.

Energy sector 
Alstom has been under investigation in France and Switzerland for allegedly making improper payments of US$200 million for contracts for Brazil's Itá hydroelectric plant, for São Paulo's subway expansion and for other major works in Venezuela, Singapore and Indonesia. The Mexican government has penalised Alstom and in 2007 the European Commission's antitrust authority fined Alstom €65 million for price fixing with competitors.

See also 

 Corruption scandals in the Paris region
 List of French political scandals
 Police corruption in France

General:
 Crime in France
 International Anti-Corruption Academy
 Group of States Against Corruption
 International Anti-Corruption Day
 ISO 37001 Anti-bribery management systems
 United Nations Convention against Corruption
 OECD Anti-Bribery Convention
 Transparency International

References

External links
France Corruption Profile from the Business Anti-Corruption Portal

 
France
Politics of France
France